William Robert James Croxford (4 September 1863 – 30 June 1950), known as James Croxford, was a New Zealand cricketer. He played six first-class matches for Otago between 1890 and 1894.

Croxford was born at Clerkenwell in London in 1863. As well as cricket, he played rugby union for Otago and stood as an umpire in first-class cricket.

References

External links
 

1863 births
1950 deaths
New Zealand cricketers
Otago cricketers
People from Clerkenwell
Cricketers from Greater London